Sportster may refer to several things, such as:

Harley-Davidson Sportster, a line of motorcycles manufactured since 1957.
ADI Sportster aircraft
Sportster line of modems, manufactured by USRobotics
 a term used in Britain to describe 18th- and early 19th-century wealthy men of leisure who frequented sporting events such as horse-racing
 Theiss Sportster, an American biplane aircraft design of the 1990s.
Warner Sportster, American light-sport aircraft